The economy of Nauru is tiny, based on a population in 2019 of only 11,550 people. The economy has historically been based on phosphate mining. With primary phosphate reserves exhausted by the end of the 2010s, Nauru has sought to diversify its sources of income.  In 2020, Nauru's main sources of income were the sale of fishing rights in Nauru's territorial waters, and revenue from the Regional Processing Centre (an offshore Australian immigration detention facility).

Nauru is dependent on foreign aid, chiefly from Australia, Taiwan and New Zealand.

Economic performance 
In the years after independence in 1968, Nauru possessed the highest GDP per capita in the world due to its rich phosphate deposits. In anticipation of the exhaustion of its phosphate deposits, substantial amounts of the income from phosphates were invested in trust funds aimed to help cushion the transition and provide for Nauru's economic future. However, because of heavy spending from the trust funds, including some wasteful foreign investment activities, the government is now facing virtual bankruptcy. To cut costs the government called for a freeze on wages, a reduction of overstaffed public service departments, privatization of numerous government agencies, and closure of some of Nauru's overseas consulates. Economic uncertainty caused by financial mismanagement and corruption, combined with shortages of basic goods, resulted in some domestic unrest. In 2004 Nauru was faced with chaos amid political strife and the collapse of the island's telecommunications system. Moreover, the deterioration of housing and hospitals has continued.

Few comprehensive statistics on the Nauru economy exist, with estimates of Nauru's GDP varying widely. According to the U.S. State Department, Nauru's GDP volume was US$1 million in 2004. Nauru receives about US$20 million foreign aid a year from Australia.

The nations economy has grown significantly since 2012, with help from the reopening of the Nauru Regional Processing Centre, funded by Australia.

The most recent 2022-23 Nauru Budget recognized expected revenues of $252.5 million and expenditure of $251.9 million (20% increase from Budget 2021-2022) with a $549,000 surplus balance. The surplus will be used to build up cash reserves at the bank and support Nauru to manage the uncertainties in the year ahead.

Balance of payments 
Phosphate is Nauru's only export product, although the government also receives relatively significant foreign exchange income from licensing its rich skipjack tuna fishing grounds to foreign fishing vessels, which land an annual average of 50,000 tonnes of Nauru zone-caught tuna overseas. In 2004 income from phosphate export was US$640,000, with Australia, New Zealand and Japan serving as the country's major export markets. In the same year the Nauru government budget shows that income from licensing foreign fishing vessels was over US$3,000,000.

Nauru needs to import almost all basic and capital goods, including food, water, fuel, and manufactured goods, with Australia and New Zealand as its major import sources. In 2004 Nauru's imports totaled about US$19.8 million.

Finance
Nauru has been a cash economy since at least 2004, after the Bank of Nauru and the Republic of Nauru Finance Corporation went bankrupt and ceased operations in the early 2000s and the licenses of all offshore banks were revoked by the Nauru government in 2004. Nauru uses the Australian dollar for its currency. Most government payments are executed through electronic funds transfer.  Electronic funds transfer at point of sale was introduced in 2020. The government is required to periodically fly in Australian currency to maintain liquidity.

On 2 June 2015, an agency of Bendigo and Adelaide Bank, Australia's fifth largest bank, was established in Nauru by the Department of Finance. Effective from the end of April 2016, Westpac, one of Australia's largest banks, ceased having any dealings with the Nauru government. On 21 April 2016, it was announced that the Bendigo Bank was facing pressure to also close its operation in Nauru. As of September 2020, the agency of Bendigo and Adelaide Bank continued to operate in Nauru.

Taxation 
On October 1, 2014, an income tax was imposed in Nauru for the first time, with high income earners paying a flat rate of 10%. The government spending in 2015 was forecast to be under US$92 million. Taxes include an airport departure tax and a bed tax at the Meneñ Hotel. The 2007–08 Budget saw the increase of existing excises on cigarettes and duty on imports. A tax on sugary foods was also introduced, chiefly to help combat Nauru's diabetes epidemic.

Tax haven status
Historically Nauru was regarded as a tax haven due to the operation of its international financial centre, which offered amongst other things offshore banking services.  In 2001, Nauru was blacklisted internationally over concerns it had become a haven for money laundering.  Amendments made in 2004 abolished Nauru's Offshore Banking sector and, as recognised in Nauru's latest anti money laundering and countering the financing of terrorism (AML/CFT) review, Nauru's offshore sector is now limited to a small offshore company register.

In July 2017 the Organisation for Economic Co-operation and Development (OECD) upgraded its rating of Nauru's standards of tax transparency. Nauru had been listed alongside fourteen other countries that had failed to show that they could comply with international tax transparency standards and regulations. The OECD subsequently put Nauru through a fast-tracked compliance process and the country was given a "largely compliant" rating.

Relationship with Australia 
Currently, Nauru is heavily dependent on Australia as its major source of financial support. In 2001 Nauru signed an agreement with Australia to accommodate asylum seekers (mostly from Iraq and Afghanistan) on the island, in return for millions of dollars in aid. This agreement, referred to as the "Pacific Solution", came to an end in 2007, prompting Nauruan concerns about the future of the island's revenue. Australia has also sent financial experts to Nauru to help the tiny nation overcome its economic problems. However, serious questions remain about the long-term viability of Nauru's economy, with uncertainties about the rehabilitation of mined land and the replacement of income from phosphates.

In 2008, talks began between Australia and Nauru regarding the future of the former's economic development aid to the latter. Nauruan Foreign and Finance Minister Dr. Kieren Keke stated that his country did not want aid handouts. One possible solution currently being explored would be for Australia to assist Nauru in setting up a "boat repair industry" for regional fishing vessels.

Nauru detention centre 
The Nauru detention centre was established by the Australian government, with Nauruan agreement, in 2001 to cater for up to 800 refugees and asylum seekers under Australia's Pacific solution. The centre is seen by Nauruans as an important source of employment opportunities, in addition to the pledge of A$20 million for development activities.

Economic statistics 

 GDP: purchasing power parity - US$60 million (2001 est.)
 GDP per capita: purchasing power parity - US$5,000 (2001 est.)
 Inflation rate (consumer prices): -3.6% (1993)
 Budget: revenues: US$23.4 million; expenditures: US$  million (1995/96)
 External debt: US$33.3 million
 Economic aid - receives around US$2.25 million from Australia (1996/97 est.)
 Currency: Australian dollar

The fiscal year runs from July 1 to June 30.

Employment 

 Labour force are mainly employed in mining phosphates, public administration by RONPhos, education and transport
 In 2004, the unemployment rate was close to 90%. In February 2008, foreign affairs minister Dr. Kieren Keke stated: "We have got a major unemployment crisis in front of us." By 2011, the unemployment rate had decreased to 23%.
 Main industries are phosphate mining, offshore banking, coconut products
 Electricity production (fossil fuels) and consumption are around 30 GWh (2000)
 Agriculture is not a major employer, coconuts are the main produce

Data 
The following table shows the main economic indicators in 2004–2022 (with IMF staff estimates for 2019–2027). Inflation below 3% is in green.

Trade 

Exports - valued at US$30 million (2018). Exporting; fish, calcium phosphates, low-voltage protection equipment, air conditioners, leather apparel. Major trading partners include Thailand 34%, Australia 16%, United States 13%, and South Korea 10%.
Imports - valued at US$90 million (2018). Importing; refined petroleum, construction vehicles, tug boats, poultry meats, cars. Major partners are Taiwan 52%, and Australia 28%.

See also 
 Phosphate mining in Nauru
 Nauru Phosphate Corporation
 Nauru Phosphate Royalties Trust
 Ministry of Finance of Nauru
 Tourism in Nauru

References

External links 
 "Nauru seeks to regain lost fortunes", Nick Squires, BBC, March 15, 2008
 "Nauru's riches to rags decline", Dan Nolan, Al Jazeera, March 17, 2008